William I of Verona (died in 1263) was the ruler of the central , or third, of the Lordship of Negroponte in Frankish Greece from 1216 to 1263. He was also the titular of king of Thessalonica from 1243 to 1246.

References

Sources 

Triarchs of Negroponte
Titular Kings of Thessalonica